Open Marriage: A New Life Style for Couples was a best selling book published by M. Evans & Company in 1972 by Nena O'Neill and George O'Neill. It was on the New York Times best-seller list for 40 weeks. It has been translated into 14 languages and has sold more than 35 million copies worldwide according to the publisher.

The book redefined the meaning of the term "open marriage" and helped foster a sexual revolution in the 1970s. The O'Neills conceived open marriage as one in which each partner has room for personal growth and can develop outside friendships. Most chapters in the book dealt with non-controversial approaches to revitalizing marriage in areas of trust, role flexibility, communication, identity, and equality. The authors intended "to strip marriage of its antiquated ideals and romantic tinsel and find ways to make it truly contemporary."

However, chapter 16, entitled "Love Without Jealousy", devoted 20 pages to the proposition that an open marriage could include some forms of sexuality with other partners. These concepts entered the cultural consciousness and the term "open marriage" became a synonym for sexually non-monogamous marriage, much to the regret of the O'Neills. In the 1977 publication of The Marriage Premise, Nena O'Neill advocated sexual fidelity in the chapter of that name. By then however, the concept of open marriage as sexually non-monogamous marriage had gained a life of its own.

The marital suggestions in the book were largely conventional, even at the time. The New York Times writes that some of its "bolder suggestions [now] seem not so much daring as painfully naïve." The book stressed that women should lead meaningful lives.

References

External links
 Open Marriage on Amazon.com

1972 non-fiction books
Non-fiction books about sexuality
Free love
Books about marriage